Vaulted gold denotes gold bullion stored in bank vaults. By acquiring vaulted gold, institutional or private investors obtain outright ownership of physical gold.

An investor who buys vaulted gold also acquires physical gold ownership. Vaulted gold comes with withdrawal or delivery options, i.e., investors can request delivery of their holdings or pick up holdings directly from the vault.

Difference 
Buyers of vaulted gold acquire direct ownership in gold. Buyers of structured products, which are based on the price of gold, acquire a claim against the issuer of the product, but no outright ownership in gold. Exchange traded funds (ETF) or exchange traded commodities (ETC) can be backed by vaulted gold. In legal terms, the position of an owner of such shares with regards to the physical gold is very different from the one of an owner of outright vaulted gold.

Bullion banks offer so-called gold accounts. Allocated gold accounts provide investors with full ownership of vaulted gold, while unallocated gold accounts provide investors only with claims against the provider, rather than any outright ownership in gold. Typically, bullion banks do not deal in quantities of less than 1000 oz (about U.S $1.7 million ) in either type of account, which means that gold accounts are mainly targeted at institutional or very wealthy private investors.

Background 
Historically, vaulted gold was primarily offered by wealthy private banks, e.g., Swiss private banks, in the form of gold accounts. However, in recent years, new providers—including both banks and non-banks (e.g., precious metals traders)—have started to offer vaulted gold or savings plans based on vaulted gold to private investors. For example, some of the first gold accumulation plans were introduced by the precious metals trading company Tanaka Kikinzoku Kogyo during the 1980s.

In addition to classical banks and precious metals traders, new online providers like direct banks or non-banks have started offering vaulted gold products to investors. These providers include Everbank in the United States, BullionVault in Great Britain, GoldMoney in the British Channel Islands and GoldRepublic in the Netherlands, among others.

Characteristics 
In most countries, only weak regulations apply for physical gold as well as vaulted gold, and vaulted gold does not qualify as a financial instrument in the legal sense. However, in the Netherlands, professionally vaulted gold is treated as an ‘Investment Object’ and therefore falls under the regulation of the Netherlands Authority for the Financial Markets (AFM).

Risks 
In addition to the market price risk of gold as an investment, buyers of vaulted gold bear a liquidity risk, which can vary significantly by provider and product features.

Furthermore, investors bear the potential risk that gold holdings are embezzled by a provider, custodian, or individual, or stolen by third parties. According to the World Gold Council, investors should check that “providers of vaulted gold services are offering outright, unencumbered gold ownership, do not lease any gold without prior approval from clients, store the gold with an independent and accredited vault operator and regularly allow inspections and audits of client gold holdings." In addition, the gold should be fully insured against standard risks.

Criticism 
There are various critics of fraudulent or overpriced gold investment schemes or inappropriate sales tactics used by some gold dealers or Multi-Level-Marketing companies. As with other unregulated investments, some dubious providers push overpriced gold savings schemes into the market through scare and high pressure sales tactics.

Literature
World Gold Council, an investor’s guide to the gold market, European Edition, December 2011.

See also
 Gold standard
 Black Friday (1869) -- Also referred to as the Gold Panic of 1869

References

 
Gold
Commodities used as an investment
Gold investments
Security